Humber Valley is a defunct provincial electoral district for the House of Assembly of Newfoundland and Labrador, Canada. As of the 2011 Census, there were 7,938 eligible voters living within the district.

Humber Valley covered some of the best agricultural land in Newfoundland and Labrador, and ran from Deer Lake to just north of Great Harbour Deep. Apart from Deer Lake, other communities in the district included Cormack, Reidville, Hampden, Sop's Arm and part of Pasadena.

The district was created for the 1975 provincial election out of parts of White Bay South, Humber East and St. George's.

In 2015, the House of Assembly was reduced to 40 seats, and the district of Humber Valley was combined with part of the district of St. Barbe, forming the new district of Humber - Gros Morne.

Members of the House of Assembly
The district has elected the following Members of the House of Assembly:

White Bay South

Election results 

|-

|-

|-

|-

|-

|-

|-

|-

|-

|-

|-

|-

|-

|-

|-

|-

|-

|-

|-

|-

|-

|-

References

External links 
Website of the Newfoundland and Labrador House of Assembly

Newfoundland and Labrador provincial electoral districts